Bayer Leverkusen had a solid season, where it managed to qualify for another Champions League campaign, following a 4th-place finish. Unlike the previous season, it failed to actively challenge for the Bundesliga title for the second year running, also going out of the Champions League already in the group stage.

The most important players of the season included Oliver Neuville, who scored 15 goals, plus attacking midfielder Michael Ballack, who cemented his position as Germany's new dominant playmaker.

Squad

Goalkeepers
  Pascal Zuberbühler
  Adam Matysek
  Frank Jurić
  Tom Starke

Defenders
  Vratislav Gresko
  Torben Hoffmann
  Lúcio
  Jörg Reeb
  Jens Nowotny
  Boris Živković
  Robert Kovač
  Diego Placente

Midfielders
  Andreas Neuendorf
  Marko Babić
  Robson Ponte
  Zé Roberto
  Michael Ballack
  Jurica Vranjes
  Pascal Ojigwe
  Frankie Hejduk
  Marquinhos
  Bernd Schneider
  Landon Donovan
  Carsten Ramelow
  Anel Džaka

Attackers
  Ali Mousavi
  Ulf Kirsten
  Paulo Rink
  Dimitar Berbatov
  Thomas Brdarić
  Oliver Neuville
  Markus Daun

Kits

Sources

Match reports

Other

Bayer 04 Leverkusen seasons
Bayer Leverkusen